Hierangela is a genus of moth in the family Gelechiidae.

Species
 Hierangela doxanthes Meyrick, 1929
 Hierangela erythrogramma Meyrick, 1894

References

Gelechiinae